Ablerus is a genus of chalcid wasps formerly belonging to the family Aphelinidae. The genus was created by the American entomologist Leland Ossian Howard in 1894 for the species named in that year by William Harris Ashmead as Centrodora clisiocampae. The genus Azotus was synonymized with Ablerus by Alexandre Arsène Girault in 1913 and Hyatt synonymized  Myocnemella with Ablerus in 1994, leaving Ablerus as the sole genus within the subfamily Azotinae. Azotinae was elevated in rank in 2013 to become the monotypic family Azotidae.

These tiny wasps are normally hyperparasitoids  and are associated with the Aleyrodidae and Coccoidea as well as the eggs of a variety of other insects. Overall there are over 90 species of Ablerus.

Species
These species belong to the genus Ablerus:

 Ablerus aegypticus Abd-Rabou, 2014 
 Ablerus albicaput Girault, 1924
 Ablerus aleuroides (Husain & Agarwal, 1982)
 Ablerus aligarhensis (Khan & Shafee, 1976)
 Ablerus amarantus Girault, 1932
 Ablerus americanus Girault, 1916
 Ablerus aonidiellae Hayat, 1974
 Ablerus arboris Girault, 1932
 Ablerus argentiscapus Girault, 1932
 Ablerus atomon (Walker, 1847)
 Ablerus baeusoides Girault, 1915
 Ablerus beenleighi Girault, 1926
 Ablerus bharathius (Subba Rao, 1984)
 Ablerus bicinctipes Girault, 1932
 Ablerus bidentatus Girault, 1913
 Ablerus bifasciatus (Girault, 1913)
 Ablerus biguttatibiae Girault, 1924
 Ablerus capensis (Howard, 1907)
 Ablerus celsus (Walker, 1839)
 Ablerus chionaspidis (Howard, 1914)
 Ablerus chrysomphali (Ghesquiere, 1960)
 Ablerus ciliatus De Santis, 1948
 Ablerus clisiocampae (Ashmead, 1894)
 Ablerus connectens Silvestri, 1927
 Ablerus crassus (De Santis, 1974)
 Ablerus delhiensis (Lal, 1938)
 Ablerus diana Girault, 1920
 Ablerus dozieri (Darling & Johnson, 1984)
 Ablerus elegantissimus Girault, 1913
 Ablerus elegantulus (Silvestri, 1915)
 Ablerus emersoni Girault, 1917
 Ablerus fasciarius Wang, Huang & Polaszek, 2016
 Ablerus gargarae Hayat, 1998
 Ablerus gratus Girault, 1929
 Ablerus grotiusi Girault, 1913
 Ablerus hastatus Girault, 1932
 Ablerus howardii Girault, 1915
 Ablerus hyalinus Girault, 1913
 Ablerus impunctatipennis Girault, 1917
 Ablerus inquirenda Silvestri, 1927
 Ablerus lepidus (De Santis, 1974)
 Ablerus leucopidis Blanchard, 1942
 Ablerus longfellowi Girault, 1913
 Ablerus macchiae (Annecke & Insley, 1970)
 Ablerus macilentus (De Santis, 1974)
 Ablerus macrochaeta Silvestri, 1927
 Ablerus magistrettii Blanchard, 1942
 Ablerus miricilia Girault, 1929
 Ablerus molestus Blanchard, 1936
 Ablerus nelsoni Girault, 1921
 Ablerus novicornis Girault, 1931
 Ablerus nympha Girault, 1913
 Ablerus palauensis Doutt, 1951
 Ablerus pan Girault, 1913
 Ablerus perfuscipennis De Santis, 1954
 Ablerus perspeciosus Girault, 1916
 Ablerus peruvianus Girault, 1916
 Ablerus piceipes Girault, 1913
 Ablerus pinifoliae (Mercet, 1912)
 Ablerus pius Girault, 1929
 Ablerus plesius (Annecke & Insley, 1970)
 Ablerus plinii Girault, 1929
 Ablerus poincarei Girault, 1913
 Ablerus promacchiae Viggiani & Ren, 1993
 Ablerus pulcherrimus (Mercet, 1922)
 Ablerus pulchriceps Zehntner, 1899
 Ablerus pullicornis Girault, 1931
 Ablerus pumilus Annecke & Insley, 1970
 Ablerus punctatus Girault, 1921
 Ablerus rhea Girault, 1929
 Ablerus romae Girault, 1932
 Ablerus saintpierrei Girault, 1913
 Ablerus separaspidis (Annecke & Insley, 1970)
 Ablerus sidneyi Girault, 1932
 Ablerus similis (De Santis, 1948)
 Ablerus socratis Girault, 1931
 Ablerus socrus Girault, 1915
 Ablerus speciosus Girault, 1913
 Ablerus stylatus (Mercet, 1927)
 Ablerus totifuscipennis Girault, 1929
 Ablerus unnotipennis Girault, 1915
 Ablerus venustulus Girault, 1915
 Ablerus williamsi (Annecke & Insley, 1970)

See also
 List of organisms named after famous people (born before 1800)
 List of organisms named after famous people (born 1800–1899)

References

External links
 
 Universal Chalcidoidea Database

Hymenoptera genera
Hyperparasites